The 2014 Kyrgyzstan League was the 23rd season of Kyrgyzstan League, the Football Federation of Kyrgyz Republic's top division of association football. Alay Osh are the defending champions, having won the previous season. The season will start on 21 March 2014, with the first round finishing on 15 July 2014. The Championship & Relegation rounds of the league are due to start again on 4 October 2014.

Teams

Stadia and locations
Note: Table lists in alphabetical order.

Dream team tournament

First round

Results

Second stage

Championship group

Table

Results

Relegation group

Table

Results

Season statistics

Top scorers

Hat-tricks

 4 Player scored 4 goals

References

External links

Football League Kyrgyzstan (Russian)

Kyrgyzstan League seasons
Kyrgyzstan
Kyrgyzstan
1